The Myasishchev VM-T Atlant (Russian: Мясищев ВМ-Т «Атлант» ("Atlas"), with the "VM-T" ("BM-T") standing for Vladimir MyasishchevTransport) was a variant of Myasishchev's M-4 Molot bomber (the "3M"), re-purposed as a strategic-airlift airplane. The VM-T was modified to carry rocket boosters and the Soviet space shuttles of the Buran program. It is also known as the 3M-T.

Design and development

The design was conceived in 1978 when Myasishchev was asked to solve the problem of transporting rockets and other large space vehicles to the Baikonur Cosmodrome. Engineers used an old 3M (a modified M-4 bomber) and replaced the empennage with dihedralled horizontal stabilizers with large, rectangular end-plate tailfins to accommodate payloads measuring as large as twice the diameter of the aircraft's fuselage. A large, aerodynamically optimized cargo container, placed on top of the aircraft, would contain the freight. In addition, a new control system was added to the plane to compensate for the added weight.

The Atlant first flew in 1981 and made its first flight with cargo in January 1982. Its main task was to ferry Energia rocket boosters from their development plant to the Baikonur Cosmodrome. On several occasions, the then-incomplete Soviet space shuttle Buran was piggybacked to the Cosmodrome as well.

Two Atlants were built. They were replaced in 1989 by Antonov's An-225 Mriya. One Atlant (RF-01502) is kept at the Zhukovsky International Airport in Russia owned by TsAGI and Gromov Flight Research Institute, the other one (RA-01402) at Dyagilevo (air base) in Ryazan.
0GT was the Buran spaceplane without tailplane and equipment, 1GT was the hydrogen tank of the Energia rocket, 2GT was the engine frame and front aerodynamic cover of Energia and 3GT was the oxygen tank of Energia. All configurations were equipped with aerodynamic cover to decrease the drag.

Specifications (VM-T)

See also

References

External links

 History and details about the VM-T Atlant
 VM-T with Buran Orbiter and with very large cargo onboard
 Aviation.ru
 VM-T stored at Dyagilevo AFB (google maps)
 VM-T stored at Zhukovsky International Airport (google maps)
 Specifications

Myasishchev aircraft
1980s Soviet cargo aircraft
Quadjets
Aircraft first flown in 1981
Aircraft related to spaceflight